Hélène Olivine Veilleux (April 3, 1911September 20, 1956), known professionally as Nanette Bordeaux, was a French Canadian-born American film actress. Bordeaux made over 15 film appearances between 1942 and 1957.

Career
Bordeaux moved with her family from Quebec to New York City in the 1930s, where she began auditioning for several theatre productions. By 1938, Bordeaux did a screen test at the Hal Roach Studios, and was chosen over 50 other actresses. She made appearances in several small movies in the 1940s, under the name Francine Bordeaux. Bordeaux was hired by Columbia Pictures director Jules White in 1949, and began appearing in several short subjects, most notably with the Three Stooges. As she sported a genuine French accent, she was often cast as a "Fifi," in films such as Hugs and Mugs, Pest Man Wins, A Missed Fortune and Loose Loot. She also had to hide her French accent under an American one in such films as Slaphappy Sleuths and Income Tax Sappy.

Death
Bordeaux's career was cut short when she died of acute bronchopneumonia on September 20, 1956 at age 45. Her last film, A Merry Mix Up, was released six months after her death.

Selected filmography
 A Merry Mix Up (1957)
 Come on Seven (1956)
 He Popped His Pistol (1953)
 Loose Loot (1953)
 A Missed Fortune (1952)
 Pest Man Wins (1951)
 Three Hams on Rye (1950)
 Hugs and Mugs (1950)
 Flung by a Fling (1949)
 Homecoming (1948) (as Francine Bordeaux)
 So Dark the Night (1946) (as Francine Bordeaux)
 Women in Bondage (1943) (as Francine Bordeaux)
 I Married an Angel (1942) (as Francine Bordeaux)

References

External links
 
 
 Nanette Bordeaux at threestooges.net
 

1911 births
1956 deaths
Actresses from Quebec
American film actresses
French Quebecers
People from Saint-Georges, Quebec
Canadian emigrants to the United States
20th-century American actresses
20th-century American comedians